Tropidophis celiae, commonly known as the Canasi dwarf boa or the Canasi trope, is an endangered species of dwarf boa, a snake in the family Tropidophiidae. The species is endemic to Cuba.

Etymology
The specific name, celiae, is in honor of Celia Puerta de Estrada, the wife of Puerto Rican herpetologist Alberto R. Estrada.

Geographic range
T. celiae is native to the northern coast of La Habana Province, western Cuba.

Habitat

Description
T. celiae is distinguished from other Tropidophis species by its tan coloration, dark brown dorsal spots, and pale neck band.

Diet
T. celiae is known to prey upon frogs.

Reproduction
T. celiae is viviparous.

References

Further reading
López, Javier Torres; Rodríguez-Cabrera, Tomás M.; Romero, Ruben Marrero; Torres, Orlando J.; Macías, Paidel Gutiérrez (2016). "Comments on the critically endangered Canasí Trope (Tropidophis celiae, Tropidophiidae): Neonates, ex situ maintenance, and conservation". IRCF (International Reptile Conservation Foundation) Reptiles & Amphibians 23 (2): 82–87.

Tropidophiidae
Endemic fauna of Cuba
Reptiles of the Caribbean
Reptiles described in 1999